Okenia rosacea, commonly known as Hopkin's rose nudibranch, is a species of sea slug, specifically a dorid nudibranch, a marine gastropod mollusc in the family Goniodorididae.

Distribution
This species was described from Monterey Bay, California. It can be found along the coast of western North America from Oregon to Baja California.

Description
These pink sea slugs are characterized by numerous long papillae on their back, tapering into a round tip. These papillae are sometimes more or less white at their tips. This pink color is produced by the xanthophyllic pigment hopkinsiaxanthin, most likely obtained through feeding on the cheilostomatous bryozoan, Integripelta bilabiata.

The mantle, foot and the head are merged into one entity with a flattened profile. The oral tentacles are lacking. The 20 gills are situated around the anal papillae and are somewhat shorter.

The shape of the taenioglossan radula is unique in this family, as the middle tooth is large and elongate, ending in a hook-like tip. The lateral teeth are small and are actually reduced to a rudimentary plate.

References

Further reading 
 Bertsch H. (1989). "Life history of the intertidal Californian nudibranch Hopkinsia rosacea MacFarland, 1905. Western Society of Malacologists, Annual Report, 21:19-20.
 Gordon D. P., Mawatari S. F. & Kajihara H. (2002). "New taxa of Japanese and New Zealand Eurystomellidae (Phylum Bryozoa) and their phylogenetic relationships". Zoological Journal of the Linnean Society 136: 199-216.
 Rudman W. B. (2004). "Further species of the opisthobranch genus Okenia (Nudibranchia: Goniodorididae) from the Indo-West Pacific". Zootaxa 695: 1-70.
 Strain H. H. (1949). "Hopkinsiaxanthin, a xanthophyll of the sea slug Hopkinsia rosacea". Biological Bulletin 97(1):206-209.
 Turgeon, D.; Quinn, J.F.; Bogan, A.E.; Coan, E.V.; Hochberg, F.G.; Lyons, W.G.; Mikkelsen, P.M.; Neves, R.J.; Roper, C.F.E.; Rosenberg, G.; Roth, B.; Scheltema, A.; Thompson, F.G.; Vecchione, M.; Williams, J.D. (1998). Common and scientific names of aquatic invertebrates from the United States and Canada: mollusks. 2nd ed. American Fisheries Society Special Publication, 26. American Fisheries Society: Bethesda, MD (USA). . IX, 526 + cd-rom page: 125

Goniodorididae
Gastropods described in 1905